Catoptria emiliae is a moth in the family Crambidae. It was described by Nikolaj Savenkov in 1984. It is found in Russia.

References

Crambini
Moths described in 1984
Moths of Asia